Alfred Bigland (1855 - 1936) was an English industrialist and an MP from 1910 to 1922.

Life
Bigland was born on 15 March 1855, son of Edwin Bigland, of Birkenhead.

He was educated at the Quaker school at Sidcot. As a supporter of the Great War, he resigned his membership of Quakers in 1914.

He married Emily Jane Arkle in 1878; they had a son, Douglas, and two daughters. Mrs Bigland died in 1931.

He was elected to Parliament as a Conservative and Unionist in the December 1910 general election, for the Birkenhead Constituency and in 1918 for the new constituency of East Birkenhead, sitting until defeated in the 1922 general election by a Liberal. His particular political interest was Tariff reform.

During the Great War, he was responsible for acquiring sufficient quantities of glycerine for the manufacture of cordite propellant. He also persuaded the War Office to drop its minimum height for recruits to enable "Bantam battalions" to be formed.

His portrait, painted by his brother, Percy Bigland is in the Williamson Art Gallery in Birkenhead.

References

External links
 

English businesspeople
English Quakers
People from Birkenhead
UK MPs 1910–1918
1855 births
1936 deaths
UK MPs 1918–1922
People educated at Sidcot School
Conservative Party (UK) MPs for English constituencies